Essars is a commune in the Pas-de-Calais department in the Hauts-de-France region of France.

Geography
The Canal d’Aire and the Lawe River separate the commune from Bethune.

Population

Places of interest
 The church of St.Jacques, dating from the twentieth century.

See also
Communes of the Pas-de-Calais department

References

Communes of Pas-de-Calais